The 18th European Artistic Gymnastics Championships for men took place in Stockholm, Sweden in 1989.

Results

All Around

Apparatus finals

Floor

Pommel horse

Rings

Vault

Parallel bars

High bar

Medal table

See also 
 1989 European Women's Artistic Gymnastics Championships

References 
 
 

European Artistic Gymnastics Championships
European Mens Artistic Gymnastics Championships, 1989
International gymnastics competitions hosted by Sweden
1989 in European sport
1989 in Swedish sport